Edward Eugene Lyon (August 8, 1871 – November 18, 1931) was a United States Army private received the Medal of Honor for actions on May 13, 1899, during the Philippine–American War. Private Lyon was part of the Young's Scouts, 2nd Oregon Volunteer Infantry Regiment. He later became a police sergeant.

Private Lyon is buried in Hollywood Forever Cemetery, Hollywood, California.

Medal of Honor citation
Rank and Organization: Private, Company B, 2d Oregon Volunteer Infantry. Place and Date: At San Miguel de Mayumo, Luzon, Philippine Islands, May 13, 1899. Entered Service At: Amboy, Wash. Birth: Hixton, Wis. Date of Issue: January 24, 1906.

Citation:

With 11 other scouts, without waiting for the supporting battalion to aid them or to get into position to do so, charged over a distance of about 150 yards and completely routed about 300 of the enemy, who were in line and in a position that could only be carried by a frontal attack.

See also
List of Philippine–American War Medal of Honor recipients

Notes

References

1871 births
1931 deaths
American municipal police officers
United States Army Medal of Honor recipients
American military personnel of the Philippine–American War
People from Oregon
United States Army soldiers
Philippine–American War recipients of the Medal of Honor
Burials at Hollywood Forever Cemetery
People from Jackson County, Wisconsin